Ballisodare is a Gaelic Athletic Association club based in the village and hinterland of Ballisodare in County Sligo, Republic of Ireland. It had existed successfully for many years before joining with the neighbouring Collooney club, initially as Collooney/Ballisodare and later Owenmore Gaels, before being revived in 1997.
It is now still a club with coaches Martin Feeney, Shane Maye, Joey Nevin, John Morrissey and Justin Corrigan.They coach from nursery to an u18 girls team and a junior ladies team.
Wins:
U12 2015 D Championship runners up
U12 2016 C Championship runners up
U14 2016 C Championship runners up
U12 2017 B Championship runners up
U14 2020 C Sheald Championship Winners 
U16 2020 C Sheald Championship Winners
U18 2020 C Sheald Championship Winners

Honours

 Sligo Senior Football Championship:
1931, 1932, 1960, 1961, 1962, 1963 (Collooney/Ballisodare - 1967, 1969)
 Sligo Junior Football Championship:
1929, 1939, 1956, 2009
 Sligo Senior Football League (Division 1):
1959, 1960, 1961
 Benson Cup:
2000, 2001

References

Gaelic games clubs in County Sligo